Grevillea rubicunda  is a species of flowering plant in the family Proteaceae and is endemic to the Northern Territory in Australia. It is an erect, spreading shrub with divided leaves with 15 to 25 lobes lobes, and white flowers.

Description

Taxonomy
Grevillea rubicunda was first formally described in 1920 by Spencer Le Marchant Moore in the Journal of the Linnean Society, Botany from specimens collected by Ludwig Leichhardt near the "table-land of the South Alligator". The specific epithet (rubicunda) means "red" or "ruddy".

Distribution and habitat
Grevillea rubicunda occurs on the Kakadu escarpment of western Arnhem Land in the tropical Top End of Australia's Northern Territory. It grows beside creeks on sandy soils on sandstone substrates.

References

rubicunda
Proteales of Australia
Endemic flora of Australia
Flora of the Northern Territory
Taxa named by Spencer Le Marchant Moore
Plants described in 1920